Xinzhuangzi railway station is a railway station on the Beijing–Baotou railway located in Xinzhuangzi Township, Xiahuayuan District, Zhangjiakou, Hebei.

See also

List of stations on Jingbao railway

Railway stations in Hebei
Xuanhua